José Brayan Riascos Valencia (born October 10, 1994), known as Brayan Riascos, is a Colombian footballer who plays as a forward for Portuguese club Marítimo, on loan from the Ukrainian club Metalist Kharkiv.

Club career
On 7 March 2022, FIFA announced that, due to the Russian invasion of Ukraine, all the contracts of foreign players in Ukraine are suspended until 30 June 2022 and they are allowed to sign with clubs outside Ukraine until that date. On 28 March 2022, Riascos used that condition to sign with Grasshoppers in Switzerland until the end of the season.

On 12 July 2022, Riascos joined Saudi Arabian club Al-Khaleej on a one-year loan. On 23 December 2022, Al-Khaleej ended the loan early and Riascos returned to Metalist.

On 5 January 2023, Riascos joined Portuguese club Marítimo on a half-year loan.

References

External links
calciozz.it

1994 births
People from Buenaventura, Valle del Cauca
Sportspeople from Valle del Cauca Department
21st-century Colombian people
Living people
Colombian footballers
Association football forwards
Sport Club Corinthians Paulista players
Associação Atlética Flamengo players
C.D. Trofense players
Clube Atlético Bragantino players
Atlético Huila footballers
F.C. Famalicão players
U.D. Oliveirense players
C.D. Nacional players
FC Metalist Kharkiv players
Grasshopper Club Zürich players
Khaleej FC players
C.S. Marítimo players
Primeira Liga players
Liga Portugal 2 players
Campeonato Brasileiro Série B players
Categoría Primera A players
Ukrainian First League players
Swiss Super League players
Saudi Professional League players
Colombian expatriate footballers
Expatriate footballers in Brazil
Colombian expatriate sportspeople in Brazil
Expatriate footballers in Portugal
Colombian expatriate sportspeople in Portugal
Expatriate footballers in Ukraine
Colombian expatriate sportspeople in Ukraine
Expatriate footballers in Switzerland
Colombian expatriate sportspeople in Switzerland
Expatriate footballers in Saudi Arabia
Colombian expatriate sportspeople in Saudi Arabia